Espen Johnsen (born 20 December 1979 in Kristiansand) is a  retired Norwegian football goalkeeper.  His brother Marius Johnsen is also a footballer, currently playing for Lillestrøm.

Football career
His career started in local club Vigør. After a few years playing for Start, he was brought to Rosenborg in Trondheim. He was mostly benched his first two years there because of the Icelandic goalkeeper Arni Gautur Arason, who left Rosenborg in 2003 for Manchester City. Espen then established himself as the first-choice in Rosenborg as well as on the Norwegian national team, but lost his place after a six-month injury layoff resulting from an injury sustained while playing against Spain.

After becoming second choice in Rosenborg after the purchase of Lars Hirschfeld, Johnsen made it clear that he was not satisfied with his "demotion", and on 6 October 2006, Strømsgodset announced that he had agreed to join them on a one-year loan deal starting January 2007. He returned to Rosenborg in 2008. In March 2010 he was linked to Swedish champions AIK and according to Norwegian press, he was edging closer to a deal with them.

Despite offers from Rosenborg and others Johnsen retired as a player in 2010 due to suffering from jumper's knee, and to focus on his studies.

Education and personal life
Espen is studying to be an M.D. at the Norwegian University of Science and Technology in Trondheim, Norway. When living in Kristiansand, he studied at the Agder University College, taking his exam in Christian studies. He is an active member of the Evangelical Lutheran Free Church of Norway.

Johnsen is in 2019 the doctor assigned to the Start first team.

Honours

Individual
 Kniksen award as Goalkeeper of the year: 2003

References

External links
 

1979 births
Living people
Kniksen Award winners
Norwegian footballers
Norway international footballers
Association football goalkeepers
Rosenborg BK players
IK Start players
Strømsgodset Toppfotball players
Eliteserien players
Norwegian University of Science and Technology alumni
University of Agder alumni
Sportspeople from Kristiansand